"Has Anybody Here Seen Kelly?", with music and lyrics by C. W. Murphy and Will Letters (1908), is a British music hall song, originally titled "Kelly From the Isle of Man". The song concerns a Manx woman looking for her boyfriend during a visit to London. It was adapted for American audiences by William McKenna in 1909 for the musical The Jolly Bachelors.   Kelly is the most common surname on the Isle of Man.

Murphy and Letters originally wrote the song for Florrie Forde, as a follow-up to another Murphy song written for Forde,  "Oh, Oh, Antonio", a success in 1908.  Forde regularly performed on the Isle of Man, between England and Ireland, each summer, and "Has Anybody Here Seen Kelly?" made reference to "Kelly from the Isle of Man" as being "as bad as old Antonio".   The song was immediately successful, becoming "the rage all over England".   In discussing the song, Murphy said: "To find a refrain which will go with a swing is the secret of success in popular song-writing for the general public... It must have a melody in which 'something sticks out', so to speak."

In the American adaptation of the song, lyrics were changed to describe Kelly as being from Ireland and visiting New York; Irish songs and performers were popular with vaudeville audiences. In Nora Bayes' 1910 recording of the song, she gives a wink to her own Jewish heritage by "accidentally" singing "Has anybody here seen Levi...I mean Kelly."

In 1926, Max Fleischer produced an animated short in the DeForest Phonofilm sound-on-film process as part of his "Song Car-Tunes" series. In 1928, William Wyler directed a feature film starring Bessie Love with this title. In 1943, the song was performed in the film musical Hello, Frisco, Hello. An instrumental rendition can be heard throughout the 1949 film It Happens Every Spring. It functions like a theme song for the main character - a science professor who becomes a baseball star under the pseudonym 'King Kelly'. In 1978's Ziegfeld: The Man & His Women, Inga Swenson, as Nora Bayes, sings the song during the scene of the first Ziegfeld Follies in 1908.  In the 1956 Adelphi Films release - restored in 2020 by Silver Salt Restoration - Stars In Your Eyes, Pat Kirkwood sings the song.

In 1917, the British composer Havergal Brian based much of the opening scene of his opera The Tigers around the song (or rather round the refrain), which runs beneath and through the action as policeman search for a missing person during a Bank Holiday carnival on Hampstead Heath. A few years later he extracted the music, without the vocal parts or transferring those parts to instruments, as an independent orchestral work, Symphonic Variations on 'Has Anybody Here Seen Kelly?'''.

Lyrics
Kelly and his sweetheart wore a very pleasant smile,
And sent upon a holiday they went from Mona's Isle,
They landed safe in London but alas it's sad to say,
For Kelly lost his little girl up Piccadilly way.
She searched for him in vain and then of course began to fret,
And this is the appeal she made to everyone she met:

Has anybody here seen Kelly?
K-E-double-L-Y.
Has anybody here seen Kelly?
Find him if you can!
He's as bad as old Antonio,
Left me on my own-ee-o,
Has anybody here seen Kelly?
Kelly from the Isle of Man!

When it started raining she exclaimed, "What shall I do?"
For Kelly had her ticket and her spending money too,
She wandered over London like a hound upon the scent,
At last she found herself outside the Houses of Parliament.
She got among the suffragettes who chained her to the grille,
And soon they heard her shouting in a voice both loud and shrill:

Has anybody here seen Kelly?
K-E-double-L-Y.
Has anybody here seen Kelly?
Find him if you can!
He's as bad as old Antonio,
Left me on my own-ee-o,
Has anybody here seen Kelly?
Kelly from the Isle of Man!

In other media
A verse from an adaptation of the song was featured in the film Catch Me If You Can on a broadcast of the 1960s television program Sing Along With Mitch. The song was also referenced in a 1959 episode of the television series Bachelor Father'' titled "Bentley, the Hero". The theme tune to Kelly Monteith's BBC TV series also used part of the song's music.

The song appears in the 2018 film "The Ballad of Buster Scruggs" directed by the Coen Brothers. The film is a six-part episodic Western with the song featuring in the sixth and final segment, "The Mortal Remains". The song was performed by Jonjo O'Neill with the song's title character's name being changed from 'Kelly' to 'Molly'. It is not known why this change was made, but it has been speculated that the softer sound of 'Molly' made the song more audibly appeasing.

References

External links
 1926 animated version at IMDB
 1926 animated version at SilentEra
 1928 live-action film at IMDB
 Hello, Frisco, Hello at IMDB

Songs about London
1908 songs
British songs
Songs with music by C. W. Murphy
Women's suffrage in England